Fancha (?–?) was the ancestor of Nurhaci. His family name is Aisin Gioro (愛新覺羅).

History 
He was a remote descendant of Bukūri Yongšon, and the grandfather of Fanca and Mentemu.

After a few generations, the family is not good at all to appease men, betrayal, clan was killed, the younger son Fancha escape.

Fancha survived legend, roughly consistent with related records the history of Korea. Fancha fled to the lower reaches of the Tumen River(圖門江) Estuary Hunchun(琿春河) Xi Guan(奚關) zongguanfu, inherited the ancestors of the dominion of Woduoli(斡朵里) Mansion.

Family 
 Eldest son: Huihou (揮厚)
 Second son: Rongshao Bauchi (容紹包奇)

Bibliography 
"Draft History of Qing"(《清史稿》)/Volume 1
"Memoir of Qing"(《清實錄》)/Taizu 1

Notes 

Aisin Gioro
Jurchens